The 1956 BRSCC Formula 1 Race was a non-championship Formula One race held on 14 October 1956 at the Brands Hatch circuit in Kent. The race was won by Archie Scott Brown, in a works Connaught-Alta. This was the first Formula 1 race to be held at Brands Hatch.

Results

References

Brands Hatch
1956 in British motorsport